The Franciscan Montessori Earth School & Saint Francis Academy (FMES/SFA) is located in Portland, Oregon, United States. FMES/SFA offers Montessori education in Portland OR. Private Preschool, Kindergarten, Elementary, Middle. It is operated by the Franciscan Sisters of the Eucharist from Bridal Veil, Oregon.

History 

Established in 1977, the school is in its 40th year. The school began with seventeen students in one classroom. As the school grew, additional grades were added in the Lower and Upper Elementary, and a  Children's House program (ages 2 1/2-6) was added. Eventually a middle school program, St. Francis Academy, was added. This program currently serves students in the 7th and 8th grade. Until 2002 the school maintained a High School program, but this is no longer open. Since 2012, the school has been undergoing a series of upgrades and renovations to its physical facilities. The middle school is housed in a separate building constructed on the campus, Clare Hall, in 1996.

Exchange Program 

FMES/SFA students who choose to take German as their foreign language have the option to be part of a German exchange program. The exchange program travels to Freiburg, Germany. German exchange students travel to Portland, Oregon.

Students also participate in an exchange sponsored by our Spanish Program. In recent years these students have traveled to Costa Rica.

Special Programs
The school has a comprehensive sports program under the auspices of CYO, and offer classes after school for dance, music, language, piano, chess, math, robotics, and more.

Accreditation
The school is accredited with NWAIS, and is a member of AMI and OMA.

Current Head Staff 

Founding Administrator: Mother Francine Cardew
Current Head of School: Sister Therese Gutting
Advancement Director: Michael Winning
Advancement Associate: Melissa McGuire
Co-Athletic Directors: Melissa McGuire and Scott Warner
Admissions Director: Deborah Dahling
Business Manager: Peter Einwaller
Volunteer Coordinator: Romila Kim 
SFA Head Guide: Laurie Langevin
Upper Elementary Head Guide:  Helena Reid
Lower Elementary Head Guide: Lorelea McAffee Einwaller
Children's House Head Guide: Priscilla Winning

External links 
FMES.org
Sisters of the Eucharist

Private elementary schools in Oregon
Private middle schools in Oregon
Montessori schools in the United States
Educational institutions established in 1977
1977 establishments in Oregon